Pont-Melvez is a commune in the Côtes-d'Armor department of Brittany in northwestern France.

Population

Inhabitants of Pont-Melvez are called pont-melvéziens in French. Pont-Melvez's population peaked at 1,808 in 1906 and declined to 611 in 2019. The population has been divided by three within a century.

Map

See also
Communes of the Côtes-d'Armor department

References

External links

Communes of Côtes-d'Armor